Men of Honor is the second studio album by American heavy metal band Adrenaline Mob. It was released on February 18, 2014 by Century Media Records. It is the only Adrenaline Mob release with drummer A. J. Pero fully involved; he would die in 2015, but be featured on a single track of the following album, We the People. The album's tracks were revealed one by one via streaming at SoundCloud, with each new track being released every week.

According to guitarist Mike Orlando, the album's title was suggested by his father. "We were thinking about names for the record, and he said 'Why don't you guys call it 'Uomini D'Onore' [translation: 'Men of Honor']?' I knew that was it. We're tight like brothers. This is a musical gang. The message is to stand strong with Adrenaline Mob. Regardless of what's changed, we are men of honor, and we will honor this entity until we die."

Track listing 
All songs written by Mike Orlando and Russell Allen unless otherwise noted.

Personnel 
Adrenaline Mob
 Russell Allen - vocals, production
 Mike Orlando - guitars, backing vocals, additional vocals on "Come On Get Up", "Let It Go", "Judgement Day", production, mastering, mixing
 John Moyer - bass
 A. J. Pero - drums
Additional personnel
Asha Mevlana - violin on "Men Of Honor"
Mark Sasso - artwork, design, layout
Larry Mazer - management
Mark "WEISSGUY" Weiss - photography

References 

2014 albums
Adrenaline Mob albums
Century Media Records albums